Scopula atramentaria is a moth of the family Geometridae. It was described by Max Bastelberger in 1909. It is endemic to Tanzania.

References

Endemic fauna of Tanzania
Moths of Africa
Moths described in 1909
atramentaria
Taxa named by Max Bastelberger